Enzo Nahuel Copetti (born 16 January 1996) is an Argentine professional footballer who plays as a winger or second forward for Major League Soccer club Charlotte FC.

Career
Copetti joined Atlético de Rafaela's academy during 2012–13. He made the step into senior football in 2016, as he made his debut on 2 June in a Copa Argentina match against Ferro Carril Oeste. In April 2017, Copetti made his first appearance in the Primera División off the bench against Huracán. Two further appearances - as a starter - followed in Rafaela's relegation season of 2016–17. He scored his first senior goal in a cup victory over Defensores de Belgrano on 24 July 2018. Copetti left the club after the 2020 campaign, which he ended with five goals in nine games; he notably netted a brace over Tigre on 7 December 2020.

On 16 February 2021, Copetti was loaned to Primera División side Racing Club; penning terms until the succeeding December, including a purchase option. He scored on his debut against Aldosivi four days later, prior to netting again in his fourth overall appearance for them on 8 March versus Rosario Central. At the end of the year, Racing made use of the purchase option, with Copetti signing a permanently deal until the end of 2024.

On 6 November 2022, Copetti became champion of Trofeo de Campeones de la Liga Profesional after beating Boca 2-1. He was the striker with most goals from Racing in all 2022.

On 11 January 2023, Copetti signed 3-year deal with Major League Soccer side Charlotte FC.

Style of play
Copetti is primarily a winger or second forward, though is capable of playing as a centre-forward and midfielder.

Career statistics

Notes

References

External links
 

1996 births
Living people
People from Presidencia Roque Sáenz Peña
Argentine people of Italian descent
Argentine footballers
Association football forwards
Argentine Primera División players
Primera Nacional players
Atlético de Rafaela footballers
Racing Club de Avellaneda footballers
Sportspeople from Chaco Province
Charlotte FC players
Designated Players (MLS)